The Newbury Comedy Festival was a festival of comedy which took place every July in the West Berkshire town of Newbury, in England. The last festival took place in 2012 although the You Must Be Joking new act competition continues on its own steam.

History
It was launched in 2004. Committed to showcasing the best comedy talent working in the UK (and not exclusively stand-up), the comedy festival became an annual event, held in the second week of July), and the only fully curated festival of its kind in the UK. In 2006, over 70 acts performed in 12 venues in Newbury.

The Independent described the Festival as "the premier summer comic gathering outside Edinburgh", with The Daily Telegraph urging readers "not to bypass it".

Notable acts
Acts who have appeared include Linda Smith, Emo Philips, Jimmy Carr, Alan Carr, Natalie Haynes, Al Murray, Rich Hall, Russell Brand, Barry Cryer, Laura Solon, Chris Addison, Howard Read, Janet Street Porter, Wil Hodgson, Jo Brand, Jenny Eclair, Gina Yashere, Sue Perkins, Susie Essman, Ardal O'Hanlon, Ed Byrne, Phill Jupitus and Josie Long.

You Must Be Joking
Sponsored by mobile phone giant, Vodafone, the Festival also promotes a new act competition, You Must Be Joking. The winners to date are:
 2015: Benji Waterstones
 2014: Peter Beckley, 2nd Don Tran
 2013: Matt Dwyer
 2012: Sean Doyle
 2011: Chris Chopping
 2010: Matt Richardson
 2009: Ian Smith (comedian) 2nd Matthew Highton
 2008: Gerry Howell, Runners Up Mark Simmons, Tom Goodliffe
 2007: Hannah Dunleavy, 2nd Gareth Richards
 2006: Tim Telling
 2005: Papa CJ
 2004: Imran Yusuf

In 2006, Wisecrackers, a stand-up competition/professional mentoring programme for young people was also launched. In 2006 the winner was Christian Robertson. In 2007, the winners for the 16-18 category were Jacob Guberg and Alexander Quayle.

References

Festivals in Berkshire
Comedy
Comedy festivals in England